Since the ratification of the United States Constitution in 1788, there have been 52 unsuccessful major party candidates for President of the United States. Additionally, since 1796, eight third party or independent candidates have won at least ten percent of the popular or electoral vote, but all failed to win the presidency.

Since the ratification of the Twelfth Amendment prior to the 1804 presidential election, the winner of any given presidential election is the candidate that receives the majority of the electoral vote. Under the rules established by the Twelfth Amendment, if no individual wins a majority of the electoral vote, then the United States House of Representatives holds a contingent election to determine the election winner; contingent elections have decided the winners of two presidential elections. Since 1824, the national popular vote has been recorded, but the national popular vote does not determine the winner of the presidential election. There have been five presidential elections in which the winner did not win a majority or a plurality of the popular vote.

The United States has had a two-party system for much of its history, and the major parties of the two-party system have dominated presidential elections for most of U.S. history. The two current major parties are the Democratic Party and the Republican Party. At various points prior to the American Civil War, the Federalist Party, the Democratic-Republican Party, the National Republican Party, and the Whig Party were major parties. These six parties have nominated candidates in the vast majority of presidential elections, but six presidential elections deviate from the normal pattern of two major party candidates. There were no major party candidates for president in the presidential election of 1789 and the presidential election of 1792, both of which were won by George Washington. In the 1812 presidential election, DeWitt Clinton served as the de facto Federalist nominee even though he was a member of the Democratic-Republican Party; Clinton was defeated by Democratic-Republican President James Madison. In the presidential election of 1820, incumbent President James Monroe of the Democratic-Republican Party effectively ran unopposed. In the 1824 presidential election, four Democratic-Republicans competed in multiple states in the general election as the party was unable to agree on a single nominee. Similarly, in the presidential election of 1836, the Whig Party did not unify around a single candidate and two different Whig candidates competed in multiple states in the general election.

Several former, incumbent, or future presidents have unsuccessfully sought the presidency. Several individuals have unsuccessfully sought the presidency as the candidate of a major party multiple times; only Henry Clay and William Jennings Bryan have done so thrice. Seven different third parties have nominated a candidate who won at least ten percent of the electoral vote or at least ten percent of the popular vote in a single election, and who was not nominated by a major party in that election. Two of those candidates, Theodore Roosevelt and John C. Breckinridge, finished with the second-highest share of the electoral vote. Since 1796, just one independent candidate, Ross Perot, has accrued more than ten percent of the popular or electoral vote. One third party candidate, Horace Greeley of the Liberal Republican Party, was nominated by a major party only after being nominated by a third party.

List of unsuccessful major party candidates

 * indicates that the candidate served as the president of the United States at some point in their career
 † indicates that the candidate won a majority or plurality of the popular vote
 ‡ indicates that the candidate won a plurality of the electoral vote
 PV% indicates the share of the popular vote won by that candidate
 EV% indicates the share of the electoral vote won by that candidate

List of unsuccessful major third-party and independent candidates

These third-party and independent candidates won at least ten percent of the electoral vote or at least ten percent of the popular vote.

 * indicates that the candidate served as the president of the United States at some point in their career
 † indicates that the candidate finished with the second highest share of the popular vote
 ‡ indicates that the candidate finished with the second highest share of the electoral vote
 PV% indicates the share of the popular vote won by that candidate
 EV% indicates the share of the electoral vote won by that candidate

See also
 List of presidents of the United States
 List of United States presidential candidates
 List of unsuccessful major party candidates for Vice President of the United States
 List of people who received an electoral vote in the United States Electoral College
 List of United States Electoral College results
 Lists of fictional presidents of the United States
 Alternate Presidents

Notes

References

Works cited

Further reading

External links
 
 

Political history of the United States
Lists of candidates for President of the United States
Presidential elections in the United States
United States presidential history